Diz Gavin (also Romanized as Dīz Gavīn and Dīzgavīn) is a village in Qaflankuh-e Gharbi Rural District, in the Central District of Meyaneh County, East Azerbaijan Province, Iran. In the 2006 census, its population was 82 persons in 22 families.

References 

Populated places in Meyaneh County